Bo Berndal (1924 in Stockholm, Sweden – 2013) was a Swedish compositor and typographer. He was co-owner of BIGG (a Swedish advertising agency) and Hålet (a gallery dedicated to the typographic arts).

Career
Berndal was a linotype operator, compositor and, later a typography teacher; he began designing type in a matrix factory in the early 1950s. After his retirement  Berndal went on designing type as a hobby.

Berndal was also a notable book designer, author, and calligrapher.

References 

1924 births
Swedish businesspeople
Swedish typographers and type designers
2013 deaths
Swedish calligraphers
Typesetters